Frank Leskošek (nom de guerre Luka; 9 December 1897 Celje – 5 July 1983 Ljubljana) was a Yugoslav politician and partisan commander.

Biography 
Born in Celje, Slovenia, Leskošek worked as a locksmith in his youth. He was drafted in to the Austro-Hungarian Army during World War I and fought mostly in the Isonzo Front. After the war he returned to his hometown and became active in the trade union movement and participated in many strikes.

Leskošek joined the Communist Party of Yugoslavia (KPJ) and in 1926 and became a member of its Central Committee in 1934. He was secretary of the Association of Metalworkers for Slovenia and chairman of the expert commission of the United Workers' Trade Unions of Slovenia. During this period he successfully hid his KPJ membership from Yugoslav authorities.

In 1935 he traveled to the Soviet Union alongside Edvard Kardelj and became a functionary in the Communist International and was appointed a member of the Politburo of the KPJ in 1936 in a conference held in Moscow. After the appointment of Josip Tito as the general secretary of the KPJ, Leskošek became one of the leading members of the party. In the fourth congress of the Communist Party of Slovenia, he was elected the first secretary of the party.

During the final elections in Yugoslavia he participated as a member of the United Opposition. After 1940 he avoided arrest by retiring the KPJ in time. He resumed his illegal activities and was once again elected to KPJ leadership.

After the creation of the Slovene Partisan units Leskošek was appointed commander of its main staff. After the war and communist take over of Yugoslavia he remained first secretary of the KPS until 1945 and was also president of the Assembly of the Delegates of the Slovene Nation.

He was Minister of Industry and Mining in the  first Slovenian government. From 1948 to 1951 he was the Federal Yugoslav Minister of Heavy Industry. From 1951 to 1953 he was chairman of the Council for Industrialization of Slovenia, then until 1958 he was a member of the executive committee of the National Group of the Federal People's Republic of Yugoslavia (FNRJ). From 1958 to 1963 he was vice-chairman of the People's Group of the FNRJ and from 1963 he was a member of the Federation Council. From 1945 to 1963 he was a member of the Slovenian group and from 1946 to 1953 and 1958 to 1963 of the federal group.

He was a member of the executive committee of the Central Committee of the Union of Communists of Slovenia (ÚV SKS) from 1956 to 1966 and then (1966 to 1968) he was a member of the presidency of ÚV SKS. Until 1964 he was a member of the Politburo of the Central Committee of the League of Communists of Yugoslavia (ÚV SKJ) and until 1969 a member of the ÚV SKJ. From 1953 he was a member of the Main Department of the Socialist Union of Working People (SSRN) of Yugoslavia and from 1967 he was a member of the presidency of the Slovenian Republican Conference of the SSRN.

Leskošek died in Ljubljana on 5 July 1983.

References 

1897 births
1983 deaths
Slovenian communists
Slovenian people of World War II
Yugoslav Partisans members
Ethnic Slovene people
League of Communists of Yugoslavia politicians
League of Communists of Slovenia politicians
Yugoslav expatriates in the Soviet Union
Recipients of the Order of the People's Hero